Thomaz Bellucci was the defending champion, but lost in the second round to Federico Delbonis.

Stan Wawrinka won the title, defeating Marin Čilić in the final, 6–4, 7–6(13–11).

Seeds
The top four seeds receive a bye into the second round.

Draw

Finals

Top half

Bottom half

Qualifying

Seeds

Qualifiers

Lucky losers
  Florian Mayer

Qualifying draw

First qualifier

Second qualifier

Third qualifier

Fourth qualifier

External links
 Main draw
 Qualifying draw

Singles